The discography of Echo & the Bunnymen, an English post-punk band which formed in 1978, consists of thirteen studio albums, ten live albums, nine compilation albums, eight extended plays (EP), and thirty singles on Zoo Records; WEA and its subsidiaries, Korova, Sire Records, London Records and Rhino; Cooking Vinyl; and Ocean Rain Records, as well as five music VHS/DVDs, and twenty-two music videos.

Echo & the Bunnymen's original line-up consisted of vocalist Ian McCulloch, guitarist Will Sergeant and bass player Les Pattinson, supplemented by a drum machine. By 1980, Pete de Freitas had joined as the band's drummer, and their debut album, Crocodiles, met with critical acclaim and made the UK Top 20. Their second album, Heaven Up Here (1981), again found favour with critics and reached number 10 in the UK. The band's cult status was followed by mainstream success in the mid-1980s, as they scored a UK Top 10 hit with the single "The Cutter", and the attendant album, Porcupine (1983), which reached number two in the UK. The next release, Ocean Rain (1984), regarded as their landmark release, spawned the hit singles "The Killing Moon", "Silver" and "Seven Seas". One more studio album, Echo & the Bunnymen (1987), was released before McCulloch left the band to pursue a solo career in 1988. The following year, de Freitas was killed in a motorcycle accident, and the band re-emerged with a new line-up. Sergeant and Pattinson were joined by Noel Burke as lead singer, Damon Reece on drums and Jake Brockman on keyboards. They released Reverberation in 1990, but the disappointing critical and commercial reaction it received culminated with a complete disbanding in early 1993.

After working together as Electrafixion, McCulloch, Sergeant and Pattinson regrouped in 1997 and returned as Echo & the Bunnymen with the UK Top 10 hit "Nothing Lasts Forever". An album of new material, Evergreen, was greeted enthusiastically by critics and the band made a successful return to the live arena. Though Pattinson left the group for a second time, McCulloch and Sergeant continue to record as Echo & the Bunnymen, releasing What Are You Going to Do with Your Life? (1999), Flowers (2001), Siberia (2005), The Fountain (2009), and Meteorites (2014).

Albums

Studio albums

Live albums

Compilation albums

Other album appearances

Extended plays

Singles

Other singles appearances

Video albums

Other video album appearances

Music videos

Notes

References

External links
 Official website
 

Discographies of British artists
Rock music group discographies
Discography
Alternative rock discographies
Punk rock discographies
New wave discographies